Pholidota imbricata, commonly known as the common rattlesnake orchid or necklace orchid, is a plant in the orchid family and is a clump-forming epiphyte or lithophyte with crowded pseudobulbs. Each pseudobulb has a single pleated, leathery leaf and up to sixty white, cream-coloured or greenish, cup-shaped flowers in two ranks along a wiry flowering stem. There is a large, papery bract at the base of each flower. This species is native to areas from tropical and subtropical Asia to the southwest Pacific.

Description
There is a large, concave pinkish bract at the base of each flower. The side lobes are erect and the midlobe is divided again into three lobes. Flowering occurs between March and May.

Taxonomy and naming
Pholidota imbricata was first formally described in 1825 by William Jackson Hooker who published the description in Exotic Flora. The specific epithet (imbricata) is a Latin word meaning "overlapping like roofing-tiles and shingles".

Distribution and habitat
The common rattlesnake orchid usually grows on trees and rocks in rainforest, sometimes in other humid, sheltered places. It occurs in China, the Indian subcontinent, Cambodia, Laos, Myanmar, the Nicobar Islands, Thailand, Vietnam, Borneo, Java, the Lesser Sunda Islands, Peninsular Malaysia, the Maluku Islands, the Philippines, Sulawesi, Sumatra, the Bismarck Archipelago, New Guinea, the Solomon Islands, Queensland, Fiji, New Caledonia, the Santa Cruz Islands and Vanuatu. In Queensland it is found on some Torres Strait Island and on the Cape York Peninsula as far south as Townsville.

References

Coelogyninae
Orchids of Australia
Plants described in 1825
Orchids of China
Orchids of India
Orchids of Indonesia
Orchids of New Guinea
Orchids of New Caledonia
Orchids of Thailand